The Jim Thorpe Classic was a college football kickoff game played from 2001-2002. In two years, the game was contested by teams in three states and was played in two different locations. In the two years the classic operated, the home team lost both games.

Game results

Records

By team

By conference

Source

References

College football kickoff games
Recurring sporting events established in 2001
Recurring sporting events disestablished in 2002